Manuel Vega Tamayo (born in Niquero, Cuba) is a right-handed baseball pitcher who plays for Granma of the Cuban National Series. He was also part of the Cuban team at the 2004 Summer Olympics, and there became the first athlete from Granma Province to win an Olympic gold medal.

Vega who is considered a fastball pitcher, was selected for the Cuban national baseball team in 2004 after posting an 8–5 record with a 3.59 ERA during that year's National Series.

References

Living people
Olympic baseball players of Cuba
Baseball players at the 2004 Summer Olympics
Olympic gold medalists for Cuba
Year of birth missing (living people)

Olympic medalists in baseball

Medalists at the 2004 Summer Olympics
People from Granma Province